John Stapleton (11 April 1816 – 25 December 1891) was an English Liberal Party politician who sat in the House of Commons between 1852 and 1874.

Stapleton was the fourth son of Thomas Stapleton, of Carlton Hill, Yorkshire, and his wife Maria Juliana Gerard, daughter of Sir Robert Gerard, bt. Stapleton was educated at the University of Edinburgh, Göttingen and Berlin. He was called to the bar at Lincoln's Inn in 1833, but later moved to the Middle Temple. He went on the Northern circuit.

At the 1852 general election, Stapleton was elected as a Member of Parliament (MP) for Berwick upon Tweed  but was unseated on petition. He was elected in 1857 but lost the seat in 1859. At the 1868 general election Stapleton was re-elected for Berwick and held the seat until his defeat at the 1874.

Stapleton died at the age of 75.

Stapleton married Frances Dorothea King, second daughter of Edward Bolton King, of Chadshunt, Warwickshire. They had three sons and four daughters.

References

External links
 

1816 births
1891 deaths
Alumni of the University of Edinburgh
UK MPs 1852–1857
UK MPs 1857–1859
UK MPs 1868–1874
Liberal Party (UK) MPs for English constituencies
Members of Lincoln's Inn
Members of the Middle Temple